The Jersey Royal is the marketing name of a type of potato grown in Jersey which has a Protected Designation of Origin. The potatoes are of the variety known as International Kidney and are typically grown as a new potato.

History
In around 1878 a Jersey farmer, Hugh de la Haye, showed friends a large potato that he had bought. It had 15 'eyes': points from which new plants sprout. They cut this potato into pieces, which they planted in a côtil (a steeply sloping field) above the Bellozanne valley. One plant produced kidney-shaped potatoes, with a paper-thin skin, which they called the Jersey Royal Fluke. This was later shortened to 'Jersey Royal'.

Present day
In modern times, the Jersey Royal is Jersey's biggest crop export, accounting for around 70% of agricultural turnover. Ninety-nine percent of production is exported to the United Kingdom.

In 2012, 28,600 tonnes of the potato, worth £28.6m, were exported from the island. This figure was down from 30,890 tonnes in 2011.

Under the Common Agricultural Policy of the European Union Jersey Royals are covered by a Protected Designation of Origin (PDO).

References

External links
 Jersey Royal promotional site

Jersey culture
Agriculture in Jersey
British products with protected designation of origin
Potato cultivars